Eurodachtha is a genus of moths in the family Lecithoceridae.

Species
 Eurodachtha pallicornella (Staudinger, 1859)
 Eurodachtha canigella (Caradja, 1920)
 Eurodachtha siculella (Wocke, 1889)
 Eurodachtha flavissimella (Mann, 1862)
 Eurodachtha nigralba Gozmány, 1978
 Eurodachtha rotundina Park, 2009

References

 , 2009: Notes on five little known genera of Lecithoceridae (Lepidoptera), with three new species from Thailand. Journal of Asia-Pacific Entomology 12 (4): 261-267.

External links
Natural History Museum Lepidoptera genus database

 
Lecithocerinae
Moth genera
Taxa described in 1978